, , or  is a lake on the border between Norway and Sweden. The Norwegian side of the lake is located in Målselv Municipality in Troms og Finnmark county and the Swedish side of the lake is located in Kiruna Municipality in Norrbotten County. The Norwegian part of the lake lies inside Øvre Dividal National Park.

Hydrology
The lake straddles two watersheds. To the northwest it drains into the river Rostaelva, a tributary of the river Målselva, which runs into the Atlantic Ocean. To the southeast it drains into the Rostoeatnu, a source river of the Lainio, itself a tributary of the Torne, which drains into the Bothnian Bay of the Baltic Sea.

References

Målselv
Norway–Sweden border
International lakes of Europe
Lakes of Norrbotten County
Lakes of Troms og Finnmark